Andrew Dannatt (born 20 November 1965) is a former professional rugby league footballer who played in the 1980s and 1990s.

Playing career

Club career
Dannatt played as a substitute (replacing  Phil Edmonds) in Hull's 0–12 defeat by Hull Kingston Rovers in the 1984–85 John Player Special Trophy Final during the 1984–85 season at Boothferry Park, Kingston upon Hull on 26 January 1985.

Dannatt played  in Hull's 24–31 defeat by Castleford in the 1986 Yorkshire Cup Final during the 1986–87 season at Headingley, Leeds on 11 October 1986.

Dannatt played  in Hull's 14–4 victory over Widnes in the Premiership Final during the 1990–91 season at Old Trafford, Manchester on 12 May 1991.

Dannatt's Testimonial match at Hull F.C. took place in 1993.

International honours
Dannatt won caps for Great Britain while at Hull in 1985 against France (2 matches), and in 1991 against France.

Outside of rugby league
Upon retirement from rugby league, Andy Dannatt became a licensee, he then left Hull to become a scaffolder in London, later returning to Hull to work as a plumbing and heating engineer.

References

External links
Profile at saints.org.uk

1965 births
Living people
British publicans
English rugby league players
Great Britain national rugby league team players
Hull F.C. players
Hull Kingston Rovers players
Rugby league players from Kingston upon Hull
Rugby league props
Rugby league second-rows
St Helens R.F.C. players